The 1972 San Francisco Giants season was the Giants' 90th year in Major League Baseball, their 15th year in San Francisco, and their 13th at Candlestick Park. The Giants finished in fifth place in the National League West with a record of 69–86. It was their first losing season in San Francisco and the franchise's first losing season since 1957, which was the franchise's final year in New York.

Offseason 
 November 29, 1971: Gaylord Perry and Frank Duffy were traded by the Giants to the Cleveland Indians for Sam McDowell.
 February 2, 1972: Hal Lanier was purchased from the Giants by the New York Yankees.
 March 27, 1972: Rich Robertson was released by the Giants.

Regular season 
Franchise legend Willie Mays was traded to the New York Mets for Charlie Williams and US$50,000. At the time, the Giants franchise was losing money. Owner Horace Stoneham could not guarantee Mays an income after retirement.

Season standings

Record vs. opponents

Opening Day lineup 

 Bobby Bonds
 Tito Fuentes
 Fran Healy
 Ken Henderson
 Dave Kingman
 Juan Marichal
 Willie Mays
 Willie McCovey
 Chris Speier

Notable transactions 
 May 11, 1972: Willie Mays was traded by the Giants to the New York Mets for Charlie Williams and $50,000.
 June 6, 1972: Brian Asselstine was drafted by the Giants in the 7th round of the 1972 Major League Baseball draft, but did not sign.
 June 6, 1972: Lenn Sakata was drafted by the Giants in the 14th round of the 1972 Major League Baseball draft, but did not sign.

Roster

Player stats

Batting

Starters by position 
Note: Pos = Position; G = Games played; AB = At bats; H = Hits; Avg. = Batting average; HR = Home runs; RBI = Runs batted in

Other batters 
Note: G = Games played; AB = At bats; H = Hits; Avg. = Batting average; HR = Home runs; RBI = Runs batted in

Pitching

Starting pitchers 
Note: G = Games pitched; IP = Innings pitched; W = Wins; L = Losses; ERA = Earned run average; SO = Strikeouts

Other pitchers 
Note: G = Games pitched; IP = Innings pitched; W = Wins; L = Losses; ERA = Earned run average; SO = Strikeouts

Relief pitchers 
Note: G = Games pitched; W = Wins; L = Losses; SV = Saves; ERA = Earned run average; SO = Strikeouts

Farm system

References

External links
 1972 San Francisco Giants team at Baseball-Reference
 1972 San Francisco Giants team at Baseball Almanac

San Francisco Giants seasons
San Francisco Giants season
San Francisco Giants